The lieutenant governor is a constitutional officer of the Commonwealth of Pennsylvania. The lieutenant governor is elected for a four-year term in the same year as the governor. Each party picks a candidate for lieutenant governor independently of the gubernatorial primary. The winners of the party primaries are then teamed together as a single ticket for the fall general election. The lieutenant governor presides in the Pennsylvania State Senate and is first in the line of succession to the governor; in the event the governor dies, resigns, or otherwise leaves office, the lieutenant governor becomes governor.

The office of lieutenant governor was created by the Constitution of 1873. As with the governor's position, the Constitution of 1968 made lieutenant governors eligible to succeed themselves for one additional four-year term. The position's only official duties are serving as president of the state senate and chairing the Board of Pardons and the Pennsylvania Emergency Management Council. Lieutenant governors often work on additional projects and have a full schedule of community and speaking events. Pennsylvania is the only state that provides an official residence, State House at Fort Indiantown Gap, for its lieutenant governor. Constructed in 1940 and previously the governor's "summer residence", it became available for Pennsylvania's lieutenant governor in 1968 when the current governor's residence was completed in Harrisburg.

List of lieutenant governors

Parties

List of acting lieutenant governors
Jake Corman – From May 17, 2022, to May 23, 2022, Corman served as acting lieutenant governor while Lieutenant Governor John Fetterman had a pacemaker implanted and recovered.

Kim Ward – John Fetterman resigned as lieutenant governor to serve in the U.S. Senate on January 3, 2023, Ward served as acting lieutenant governor until January 17, 2023, when Lieutenant Governor-elect Austin Davis was sworn in.

Vice-presidents of Pennsylvania

From 1777 to 1790 the executive branch of Pennsylvania's state government was headed by a Supreme Executive Council consisting of a representative of each county and of the City of Philadelphia. The Vice President of the Council—also known as the Vice-President of Pennsylvania—held a position analogous to the modern office of lieutenant governor. Presidents and vice-presidents were elected to one-year terms and could serve up to three years—the full length of their regular term as Counsellor. Ten men served as Vice-President during the time of the Council's existence.

George Bryan 1777–1779
Matthew Smith 1779
William Moore 1779–1781
James Potter 1781–1782
James Ewing 1782–1784
James Irvine 1784–1785
Charles Biddle 1785–1787
Peter Muhlenberg 1787–1788
David Redick 1788
George Ross 1788–1790

References